Christopher Yarran (born 19 December 1990) is a former professional Australian rules footballer who played for the Carlton Football Club in the Australian Football League (AFL). He was also listed with the Richmond Football Club but did not play a senior match.

Early life
Yarran is an Indigenous Australian footballer who played his junior years in Western Australia. He was primarily a small forward in his junior days, but occasionally spent time in the midfield and defence. At 17 years old, Yarran gained selection into the Swan Districts senior team, where he played thirteen games and kicked thirty-nine goals, including seven on debut and eight in three finals matches.  
He played with Western Australia in the under 18s championships and kicked eight goals in four games. He was selected to join the Australian Institute of Sport-AFL academy in the 2006/07 intake and captained a team from the Clontarf Football Academy in a game against a visiting South African under 19s side in February 2007.

Yarran is the cousin of former Fremantle player Shane Yarran.

AFL career

Draft
Yarran was a noted talent and was expected to be drafted high, with some considering him to be the one of the most talented players available in the draft. He would ultimately be selected by the Carlton Football Club with its first round selection (sixth overall) in the 2008 national draft.  At draft time, Carlton coach Brett Ratten said that Yarran could assist fellow small forward Eddie Betts, and help to reduce the defensive pressure on then full-forward Brendan Fevola.

Carlton (2009–2015)
Yarran played his first senior game for Carlton in round 7, 2009 against . He played sporadically for Carlton during the season, managing six games, but played most of his games with Carlton's Victorian Football League (VFL) affiliate team, the Northern Bullants, including a five-goal performance in the VFL preliminary final. In 2010, Yarran played sixteen games for Carlton, and earned an AFL Rising Star nomination. Throughout that season, Yarran formed part of a short-lived forward-line structure consisting of tall full-forward Setanta Ó hAilpín, and three small forwards (Betts, Yarran, and Yarran's Swan Districts teammate Jeff Garlett) who became known as "Setanta's Little Helpers".

In 2011, coach Brett Ratten abandoned the tactic of playing three small forwards in favour of two: Betts and Garlett. Yarran was moved onto the half-back line, and within the year became a damaging rebounding defender, able to use his speed, agility and accurate disposal to set up much of Carlton's rebound play. Yarran played twenty-three games for the season and finished tenth in the John Nicholls Medal. His output in the 2012 season was interrupted by a turf toe injury, but he was the winner of the Goal of the Year, for a goal in round 1 in which he gathered a loose ball on the half-forward flank, evaded three  opponents and skirted the boundary line before goaling from 50 metres.

Richmond
He failed to play a match for the club in 2016 though after dealing with mental health issues. Yarran subsequently made a return to training, participating in the club's first day of pre-season training ahead of the 2017 season. He was released from his contract the very next day however, after a mutual decision that he was unable to meet the demands of league football as a result of ongoing mental health issues.

Other work
Yarran featured in the award-winning 2010 documentary film, Three Boys Dreaming, which followed the lives of him and two other young Indigenous Australian footballers over a four-year period from ages 14 to 18.

Personal life
In May 2019, Yarran was sentenced to five years in jail after stealing cars, attacking police and members of the public while under the influence of methamphetamine. He was released on parole in April 2022.

References

External links

Australian rules footballers from Western Australia
Carlton Football Club players
Indigenous Australian players of Australian rules football
Swan Districts Football Club players
Living people
People educated at Governor Stirling Senior High School
1990 births
Place of birth missing (living people)
Preston Football Club (VFA) players
Australia international rules football team players
AFL Academy graduates